Óscar Urralburu Arza (Pamplona, 8 September 1971) is a Spanish professor and politician,  deputy in the Regional Assembly of Murcia and member of Podemos.

Biography 

Óscar Urralburu graduated in Fine art by the University of Castilla-La Mancha and has a PhD from the University of Murcia. Since 1996 is a teacher of secondary education and since 2006 is an associate professor of the University of Murcia, having as well different offices in the teaching union STERM.

In February 2015 he was elected as Secretary-General of Podemos Region of Murcia, likewise being designated in April as presidential candidate of the Región of Murcia obtaining six seats in the regional elections of May.

In June 2017, he was reelected Secretary-General of Podemos-Region of Murcia.

References 

1971 births
Living people
Members of the Regional Assembly of Murcia
People from Pamplona
Podemos (Spanish political party) politicians
Spanish trade unionists